Pleurocolpus boileaui is a species of crabs in the family Xanthidae, the only species in the genus Pleurocolpus.

References

Xanthoidea
Monotypic arthropod genera